Kevin Harmon (born October 26, 1966) is a former American football running back. He played for the Seattle Seahawks from 1988 to 1989.

References

1966 births
Living people
American football running backs
Iowa Hawkeyes football players
Seattle Seahawks players